Rev. George Momodu Kiadii is a Liberian politician and Christian Minister. He ran for President of Liberia in 2005 as a member of the National Vision Party of Liberia (NATVIPOL).

Career 
Kiadii was at various times both a leader in the anti-Charles Taylor expatriate movement in the United States and Taylor's Ambassador at-large in charge of wooing investors to the country.

Running as the NATVIPOL presidential candidate in the 11 October 2005 elections, Kiadii placed 20th out of 22 candidates, receiving 0.4% of the vote.

References

Living people
Year of birth missing (living people)
Candidates for President of Liberia
Liberian Christians
Liberian expatriates in the United States
National Vision Party of Liberia politicians
21st-century Liberian politicians